Joseph "Hop Toad" Giunta (1887 – May 7, 1929), was an American mobster with the Chicago Outfit. He was born in Cicero, Illinois. He was of Italian descent.

Biography

After the murder of Unione Siciliana president Pasqualino "Patsy" Lolordo, Giunta became the new president of the Siciliana in 1929. He unsuccessfully tried to organize a revolt against Al Capone's gang. As a result, according to legend, Giunta and his co-conspirators (Albert Anselmi and John Scalise) were beaten and shot to death by Capone at a party. Their bodies were found the next day in Hammond, Indiana.

Giunta was buried at Mount Carmel Cemetery in Hillside, Illinois.

References

1887 births
1929 deaths
American gangsters of Italian descent
American gangsters of Sicilian descent
Prohibition-era gangsters
People from Cicero, Illinois